Bai Xingjian (776–826) was a Chinese novelist, poet, and short story writer. He was a younger brother of the famed poet Bai Juyi.

One of his most famous works is the novella The Tale of Li Wa. It has been translated into English many times:
 by Arthur Waley in More Translations from the Chinese (1919) — as "The Story of Miss Li".
 by Yang Xianyi and Gladys Yang in The Dragon King's Daughter: Ten T'ang Dynasty Stories (1962) — as "Story of a Singsong Girl".
 by Glen Dudbridge in The Tale of Li Wa: Study and Critical Edition of a Chinese Story from the Ninth Century (1983).
It was also translated into many other languages, for example German by Franz Kuhn and French by André Lévy. He is also believed to have written the poem "Tiandi yinyang jiaohuan dalefu".

Further reading

 Zhongguo gudian xiaoshuo yanjiu zilao (T: 中國古典小說研究資料), ed., Bo Xingjian yu "Li Wa zhuan" (T: 白行簡與李娃傳). Taipei: Tianyi chubanshe, 1982.

References 

776 births
826 deaths
8th-century Chinese poets
9th-century Chinese poets
9th-century writers
Tang dynasty novelists
Tang dynasty poets